William Francis Schey (1857–1913) was an Australian politician.

Early life
Schey was born in England and educated in London. After a short time in New Zealand, Schey arrived in Sydney as first mate of a ship in 1875. After tiring of work on the seas, Schey worked as a chainman for the Harbours Department then joined the railways, after becoming the first paid secretary of the Railways and Tramways Association.

Political career
Schey entered the New South Wales Parliament in 1887, serving until his electoral defeat in 1898. Schey initially served as one of four  members for the Electoral district of Redfern in the New South Wales Legislative Assembly. He was not a strong supporter of free trade and had disagreements with the leader Sir Henry Parkes. He was returned to the Legislative Assembly 5 months later, narrowly winning the Redfern by election in July. He had such strong connections with railway employees and the Eveleigh Railway Yards he was dubbed the member for Eveleigh. He was re-elected to Redfern in 1891. Multi-member districts were abolished in 1894, and Schey stood as an  candidate for the new district of Darlington, which included the Eveleigh Railway Yards. He returned to the Protectionist party, winning the election in 1895, however he was defeated in 1898. He did not hold ministerial or other office. Schey twice carried the "eight hour" bill through the Legislative Assembly only to see it defeated in the Legislative Council.

Later life
In 1900 Schey was elected Chairman of the Royal Commission to Labor Matters. In 1905 Schey was appointed Director of Labor, a position he held until his death in 1913.

In 1895 Schey was concerned at the social toll of the 1890s depression. Schey was an engine behind the 1896 creation of a Government funded co-operative farm, established to assist men and their families who were victims of sickness and unemployment. Schey took so much interest in the co-operative training farm that the area became favourably known as Scheyville from 1907 onwards.

References

 

1857 births
1913 deaths
Protectionist Party politicians
Members of the New South Wales Legislative Assembly
British emigrants to Australia
Politicians from Sydney